Young, Jewish, and Left is an American documentary that presents several US-based leftist Jews grappling with identity, politics, and culture.

Synopsis 
Young, Jewish, and Left  combines queer culture, Jewish-Arab history, secular Yiddishkeit, anti-racist analysis, and religious traditions into a multi-layered picture of the circa 2006 Jewish Left.  Personal experiences from many of the era's leading Jewish activists frame  Jewish identity in what it the official website says is "a fresh and constructive take on race, spirituality, Zionism, queerness, resistance, justice, and liberation."

Dan Berger, in Left Turn magazine, writes: "Young Jewish and Left provides a beautiful cross-section of today's visionary thinkers, activists, and artists. The film celebrates the profound legacy of resistance among Jews—and criticizes the reactionary elements in Jewish communities, from the occupation to assimilation, patriarchy and homophobia. And it calls the Left to task for generally lacking an understanding of Jewish history or culture.

Jennifer Bleyer, on Nextbook argues that it "... proves that the legacy of Jewish socialists, anarchists, feminists, Yippies, hippies, organizers, and agitators of the past century lives on..."

People featured 
The following people are featured in the documentary:

 Vicki Alcoset – Working class, mixed-race Jew
 Micah Bazant – Co-author of the Love & Justice in Times of War Haggadah
 Rabbi Haim Beliak – Co-director, Stop Moskowitz Campaign
 Jenine Bressner – Artist
 Lena Broderson – Hebrew school teacher
 Julia Caplan – Co-founder of Jewish Voice for Peace, San Francisco Bay Area
 Yonah Diamond – Union organizer
 Nava Etshalom – Writer and activist
 Harmony Goldberg – Educator, SOUL (School of Unity & Liberation)
 Miriam Grant – Former participant and staff, Jewish Youth for Community Action
 Shira Hassan – Social worker
 Haddasah Ladies for Homos
 Molly Hein – Media artist and Klezmer singer
 Julie Iny – Community organizer and historian of Arab Jewish Left
 Loolwa Khazoom – Editor, The Flying Camel: Essays on Identity by Women of North African and Middle Eastern Jewish Heritage
 Paul Kivel – Violence prevention educator
 Rabbi Michael Lerner – National chair, The Tikkun Community, and author
 And A. Lusia – Rabble rouser
 Josina Manu Maltzman – Feygelech for a Free Palestine
 Rachel Marcus – Student, Oberlin College, grew up going to Kinderland – Jewish socialist summer camp
 Emily Nepon – Co-creator of Suck My Treyf Gender, Bar Mitzvah-boy drag performer, author of [www.newjewishagenda.net NewJewishAgenda.net]
 Steve Quester – Early-childhood educator and queer Jewish activist
 Penny Rosenwasser – Jewish Voice for Peace, board member
 Jna Shelomith – Revolutionary
 Deb Shoval – Playwright, director of An Olive on the Seder Plate
 Dara Silverman – Director of Jews for Racial and Economic Justice
 Rabbi Arthur Waskow – Director of Shalom Center and author
 Liz Werner – Writer/translator/teacher, grandparents blacklisted in the McCarthy era

Festivals and conferences 
The film was featured at the following festivals and conferences:

 2006 ARPA International Film Festival
 2007 Pioneer Valley Jewish Film Festival
 2007 Minneapolis Jewish Film Festival
 2007 Not Quite Kosher Film Festival, San Diego State University Hillel
 2007 Big Muddy Film Festival, University of Southern Illinois
 2007 Jewdas Jewish Film Festival, London
 2007 National Conference on Organized Resistance
 2007 Practicing Jews: Art, Identity, and Culture Conference
 2008 Maine Jewish Film Festival

References

External links 
 
 Official Myspace Page
 Interview in Jewish Forward
 Review in Left Turn Magazine
 Abstract from article in Bridges: A Jewish Feminist Journal
 Screening schedule on Free Speech TV
 Clip from movie about anti-Semitism on youtube

2006 films
American documentary films
Documentary films about Jews and Judaism in the United States
2006 documentary films
Films about activists
2000s English-language films
2000s American films